The 1967 NHL Amateur Draft was the fifth NHL Entry Draft. It was held June 7, 1967, the day after the 1967 expansion draft, at the Queen Elizabeth Hotel in Montreal, Quebec.

Selections by round
Listed below are the selections in the 1967 NHL amateur draft.

Round one

Round two

Round three

See also
 1967–68 NHL season
 1967 NHL Expansion Draft
 List of NHL players

References

External links
 1967 NHL amateur draft player stats at The Internet Hockey Database
 HockeyDraftCentral.com

Draft
National Hockey League Entry Draft